Copley Township is one of twenty-one townships in Knox County, Illinois, USA.  As of the 2010 census, its population was 348 and it contained 235 housing units.  In the 1850 report, the township was named Prince Albert Township.  It was later named Richfield Township, and the name was changed to Copley Township on June 8, 1853.

Geography

Cities, towns, villages
 Victoria (west half)

Cemeteries
The township contains these four cemeteries: Martin, Old Scotch, Smith and Westfall.

Lakes
 Corn Crib Lake
 Little John Club Lake
 Long Lake
 Manson Heights Lake
 North Lake
 Peterson Lake
 Roundhouse Lake
 Skender Lake
 South Lake

Demographics

School districts
 Rowva Community Unit School District 208

Political districts
 Illinois's 18th congressional district
 State House District 74
 State Senate District 37

References
 
 United States Census Bureau 2009 TIGER/Line Shapefiles
 United States National Atlas

External links
 City-Data.com
 Illinois State Archives
 Township Officials of Illinois

Townships in Knox County, Illinois
Galesburg, Illinois micropolitan area
Townships in Illinois